Sackler is a surname. Notable people with the surname include:

 Arthur M. Sackler, American physician and pharmaceutical entrepreneur
 Elizabeth Sackler, American philanthropist
 Howard Sackler, American playwright (The Great White Hope)
 Mortimer Sackler, American pharmaceutical entrepreneur, brother to Arthur and Raymond
 Raymond Sackler, American pharmaceutical entrepreneur, brother to Mortimer and Arthur
 Richard Sackler (born 1945), American billionaire businessman, son of Raymond

See also
 Sackler family, American family at the center of the opioid crisis known for founding and owning the pharmaceutical companies Purdue Pharma and Mundipharma
 Sackler Prize for theoretical physics
 Sackler Faculty of Medicine – in Tel Aviv, Israel
 Sackler Library – at Oxford University